Dositheus of Jerusalem (? – after 1191) was twice Ecumenical Patriarch of Constantinople (for 9 days in February 1189, and again from September/October 1189 until he was restored as Patriarch of Jerusalem on 3 September 1191 and abdicated as Patriarch of Constantinople on 10 September 1191). He was previously Greek Orthodox Patriarch of Jerusalem (1187–1189). He was a close friend of the Byzantine Emperor Isaac II Angelos.

References

Bibliography 
 
 
 
 

12th-century births
12th-century patriarchs of Constantinople
12th-century Greek Orthodox Patriarchs of Jerusalem